Walnut Street is a SEPTA Media-Sharon Hill Trolley Line stop in Upper Darby, Pennsylvania. It is officially located at Garrett Road and Walnut Street, but Bywood Avenue is also included as it parallels the north side of the line. The station serves both Routes 101 and 102, and only local service is provided on both lines. The station contains two platforms with plexiglass bus-type shelters on both sides of the tracks, both of which are at the far end of each platform.

Trolleys arriving at this station travel between 69th Street Terminal further east in Upper Darby and either Orange Street in Media, Pennsylvania for the Route 101 line, or Sharon Hill, Pennsylvania for the Route 102 line. Both lines run parallel to Garrett Road and Bywood Avenue on private right-of-way, and Walnut Street is the easternmost stop where the lines run parallel to both streets. The station is located west of the Upper Darby Township Municipal Library.

Station layout

References

External links

Route 101 Express Trolley at Walnut Street Station (WorldNYCSubway.org)
 Station from Google Maps Street View

SEPTA Media–Sharon Hill Line stations